Decima Victima was a band formed by two Swedes and two Spaniards. During their short career between 1981 and 1984 they released two LPs, a maxisingle, two EPs and three singles.

History

Early Years 
In 1981, brothers Lars and Per Mertanen formed the instrumental duo Cláusula Tenebrosa. After a show they started talking about the possibility of rehearsing with Carlos Entrena, a friend at the time and ex-singer of the recently split Ejecutivos Agresivos.

In 1981, with some friends, they started the independent label Grabaciones Accidentales (GASA), so they could release their own records.

Quartet 
In 1982, they decided to replace the drum machine by real drums and Jose Brena joined the band.

'Tan Lejos' was so well received by the radio that months later Décima Víctima won The Maqueta de Oro (Golden Demo), an award voted by the listeners of Radio 3 (Radio Nacional de España, Spain's National Public Broadcaster), as one of the favourite tracks of 1982.

The sound, in spite of being played with only three instruments and voice, was as enveloping live as it was on record, thanks to the Mertanen Brothers' personal way of playing and to having, most of the times, Paco Trinidad as their sound engineer.

Most of their live shows were in Madrid, but they also played in Barcelona, Vigo, Valencia, Puertollano and Molina de Aragón.

The End 
The band ended mainly for work reasons beyond their control. There were no musical or personal differences. They always were, above all, very good friends.

Their last show was at Madrid's Rock-Ola on December 3, 1983.

In the winter of 1983 Décima Víctima recorded live, on a 4-track, a demo for their second Lp, 'Un Hombre Solo'. A few months later, already disbanded, they recorded it in the studio.

Discography 
Studio albums
 1982: Décima Víctima LP
 1984: Un Hombre Solo LP
Maxis, EPs and singles
 1982: El Vacío EP
 1982: Tan Lejos EP
 1982: Detrás de la Mirada Single
 1983: Algo en Común Maxisingle
 1983: Un lugar en el Pasado Single
 1984: Un Hombre Solo Single
Compilation albums
 1994: Resumen CD
 2010: Décima Víctima Box Set which includes their two LPs, an LP with the singles and demos and a booklet with the group's history, rare photos and lyrics.

Band members 
 Carlos Entrena (Vocals)
 Lars Mertanen (Guitar)
 Per Mertanen (Bass)
 José Brena (Drums)

External links 
 Official Website of Décima Víctima
 Carlos Entrena's Memorias Borrosas
 Lars Krantz' Official Website (formerly Lars Mertanen)
 Biography and discography of Décima Víctima
 Biography in Popes80
 Interview in Planeta Amarillo
 Cretina Blog about Décima Víctima
 Interview in Mondosonoro
 Non-official page in Myspace
 Non-official Facebook
 Interview in Disco Grande of Radio3 (4 feb 2011)

Spanish post-punk music groups
Spanish musical groups
Musical groups from Madrid
Musical groups established in 1981
Musical groups disestablished in 1984
Musical quartets